Joe Puleo was an Olympic weightlifter for the United States.

About
Joseph "Joe" Robert Puleo was born in Detroit, Michigan. He was an attorney, but is now retired and living in Fort Myers, Florida.. He competed in his weightlifting competitions as a middleweight, light-heavyweight, and middle-heavyweight.

Organizations
Puleo was a member of the York Barbell Club, York.

Weightlifting achievements
Olympic team member (1968 and 1980)
Senior National Champion (1962, 1964, 1966, 1967, and 1968)
1st in the Pan American Games Middleweight class (1963)
1st in the Pan American Games Light-heavyweight class (1967)

References

External links
Joe Puleo - Hall of Fame at Weightlifting Exchange

American male weightlifters
Olympic weightlifters of the United States
Weightlifters at the 1968 Summer Olympics
Sportspeople from Detroit
Living people
1942 births
Pan American Games medalists in weightlifting
Pan American Games gold medalists for the United States
Weightlifters at the 1963 Pan American Games
Weightlifters at the 1967 Pan American Games
20th-century American people
21st-century American people